These are the squads for the national teams participated in the Copa do Craque de Masters held in Brazil, in 1990. The tournament was played in a round robin format and the hosts won the trophy.

Group

Head coach: Luciano do Valle

Head coach: Joop Stoffelen
Assistant coach: Willy van de Kerkhof

Head coach: Ryszard Kowenicki

Head coach: Ferruccio Valcareggi

Head coach:  Carmelo Faraone

References

http://www.rsssf.com/tablesp/pele-wc.html
http://memoria.bn.br/docreader/DocReader.aspx?bib=030015_11&PagFis=6652&Pesq=MASTERS%20tarantini
http://memoria.bn.br/DocReader/DocReader.aspx?bib=112518_06&PagFis=28421
http://memoria.bn.br/DocReader/DocReader.aspx?bib=112518_06&PagFis=155&Pesq=CRAQUE%20MASTERS%20CAUSIO
http://www.rsssfbrasil.com/sel/brazil198795mr.htm
http://memoria.bn.br/DocReader/DocReader.aspx?bib=112518_06&PagFis=198&Pesq=CRAQUE%20MASTERS%20CAUSIO
http://memoria.bn.br/DocReader/DocReader.aspx?bib=112518_06&PagFis=97&Pesq=CRAQUE%20MASTERS%20CAUSIO
http://trivela.uol.com.br/quando-luciano-valle-treinou-selecao-de-pele-rivellino-zico-e-dinamite/ 
http://www.football-the-story.com/copa-pele-coupe-du-monde-des-veterans
http://lucarne-opposee.fr/index.php/culture-foot/4717-la-copa-pele-l-autre-coupe-du-monde

World Cup of Masters events
1990
1990 in Brazilian football